Begard Talabani (born 1978) is the minister of agriculture and water resources in the Kurdistan Regional Government of Iraq.

Growing up 
Talabani from Sulaimaniyah, the second-largest city in the Kurdistan region with a bachelor's degree in biological sciences.

Work and responsibility 
She served as secretary of the Kurdistan Parliament in the fifth session of 2017, headed the PUK bloc in the fourth session of the Kurdistan Parliament from 2013 to 2017, and is also in charge of the PUK's Monitoring and Follow-up Office from 2011 to 2013.

References

University of Sulaymaniyah
1978 births
Kurdish people
People from Sulaymaniyah
Living people